NOWO (“novo”) is a Portuguese telecommunications company. It is one of the four triple play operators in Portugal.

Apax France and Fortino Capital have been NOWO's shareholders since September 2015. In Portugal, these groups also own the telecommunications company ONI, which operates in the corporate market, however, ONI was already previously owned by Cabovisão, after its purchase by Altice Portugal, in 2012.

NOWO has one of the biggest fiber optic networks, around 14,000 km (~8,700 mi) (covering more than 70 municipalities and 200 parishes), with the capacity of providing service to more than 900 thousand houses. The operator offers wide coverage in the central, interior and southern areas of Portugal.

NOWO is also known for offering the cheapest packages in the Portuguese market. The Portuguese telecommunications operator has opted for a price reduction strategy, which no other operator in the market practices.

History

NOWO was created in September 2016 as a result of the Cabovisão rebranding.

NOWO has national mobile coverage, with 4G speeds, allowing the company to create a mobile offer available throughout the country and abroad, through roaming agreements established with foreign operators. The coverage is possible due to the MVNO agreement- mobile virtual network operator which allows use of other operator networks – celebrated in January 2016 with MEO.

References

External links
 NOWO official website (Portuguese)
 Apax France 
 Fortino

Telecommunications companies of Portugal
Internet service providers of Portugal
Telecommunications companies established in 1993
Cable television companies
1993 establishments in Portugal